The 1947 All-SEC football team consists of American football players selected to the All-Southeastern Conference (SEC) chosen by various selectors for the 1947 college football season. Ole Miss won the conference.

All-SEC selections

Ends
Barney Poole, Ole Miss (College Football Hall of Fame)  (AP-1, UP)
John North, Vanderbilt (AP-2, UP)
Dan Edwards, Georgia (AP-1)
Abner Wimberly, LSU (AP-2)
Rebel Steiner, Alabama (AP-3)
George Broadnax, Georgia Tech (AP-3)

Tackles
Bobby Davis, Georgia Tech (AP-1, UP)
Dub Garrett, Miss. St. (AP-1, UP)
Bill Erickson, Ole Miss (AP-2)
Wash Serini, Kentucky (AP-2)
Denver Crawford, Tennessee (AP-3)
Charles Compton, Alabama (AP-3)

Guards
John Wozniak, Alabama (AP-1, UP)
Bill Healy, Georgia Tech (AP-1, UP)
Herbert St. John, Georgia (AP-2)
Tex Robertson, Vanderbilt (AP-2)
Wren Worley, LSU (AP-3)
Lee Yarutis, Kentucky (AP-3)

Centers
Jay Rhodemyre, Kentucky (AP-1, UP)
Vaughn Mancha, Alabama (AP-2)
Louis Hook, Georgia Tech (AP-3)

Quarterbacks
Charlie Conerly, Ole Miss (College Football Hall of Fame)  (AP-1, UP)
Y. A. Tittle, LSU (AP-2, UP)
John Rauch, Georgia (College Football Hall of Fame) (AP-2)
Harper Davis, Miss. St. (AP-3)

Halfbacks
Harry Gilmer, Alabama (College Football Hall of Fame)  (AP-1, UP)
Shorty McWilliams, Miss. St. (AP-1)
Bobby Forbes, Florida (AP-2)
Bobby Berry, Vanderbilt (AP-3)
Allen Bowen, Georgia Tech(AP-3)

Fullbacks
Lowell Tew, Alabama (AP-2, UP)
Albin "Rip" Collins, LSU (AP-1)
Eddie Price, Tulane (College Football Hall of Fame) (AP-3)

Key

AP = Associated Press

UP = United Press

Bold = Consensus first-team selection by both AP and UPI

See also
1947 College Football All-America Team

References

All-SEC
All-SEC football teams